The Battle of Ljubić was a pitched battle between the Serbian revolutionary forces under Miloš Obrenović and the Ottoman troops commanded by Ćaja-paša, on the Ljubić hill near Čačak. It was the largest and most significant armed engagement of the Second Serbian Uprising.

History
After the liberation of Rudnik, Serbian Revolutionaries commanded by Lazar Mutap-Čačanin began attacking Ottoman positions near Čačak. On 6 May 1815 the Ottomans responded to Serbian incursions by sending a force of 7,000-strong under Imšir Ćaja-paša to attack the rebels from the rear. The rebels quickly retreated to Ljubić hill, where they regrouped and were reinforced with detachments commanded by Miloš Obrenović and Jovan Dimitrijević Dobrača. The initial Serbian forces were 1,500 infantry and 200 cavalry, with additional reinforcements of 3,000-strong. The battle ended in Serbian victory, with Serbs capturing large areas of territory and seizing valuable amounts of weaponry. Serbian losses amounted to 1,500, against the complete destruction of Ottoman forces, including their commander Imšir (Ćaja-Paša). The City of Čačak was captured and Serbs further advanced to Kragujevac, Jagodina, Karanovac, Batočina, and Požarevac.

References

Ljubic
Ljubic
Second Serbian Uprising
Conflicts in 1815
1815 in Serbia
May 1815 events